RedEye is a publication put out by the Chicago Tribune geared toward 18 to 34-year-olds. It was published every weekday since its inception until February 3, 2017.  Publication was reduced to weekly starting February 9, 2017.  Daily circulation was 250,000 as of December 2, 2009.

Competition
RedEye (not to be confused with Red Eye, or Red-Eye, or other popular international websites and business sharing the same name) was created because of the Chicago Tribune and other major newspapers' loss of readership among young people.  Tribune Company began publishing the RedEye in an effort to pull readers back into readership and eventually migrate them into the big edition (Tribune).

When RedEye appeared, it was in direct competition with another paper Red Streak, which the Tribune's Chicago competitor the Sun-Times began publishing at the same time. Initially, both papers were handed out for free by "hawkers" on street corners, usually with one vendor from each paper directly next to each other. After about 6 months of the free papers, both companies placed vending boxes throughout the city with the papers thereafter costing 25 cents.  At the end of 2005, the Sun-Times discontinued Red Streak. According to Sun-Times publisher John Cruickshank, Red Streak was only launched "to stop [the Tribune] from gaining a foothold in the paid tabloid market...". Its only purpose was to undermine RedEye'''s attempt at drawing commuters, customers which have historically belonged to the Sun-Times.  At the beginning of 2006, RedEye became a free paper once again, with vending boxes being unlocked and coin slots covered over.

In February 2007, after NewsCorp launched a late-night talk television program on Fox News entitled Red Eye, the Tribune Company filed a federal trademark infringement lawsuit.

Content

As compared with mainstream newspapers, RedEye strongly emphasizes pop culture and entertainment news, humorous or lighthearted rather than serious columns, and flashy graphics and large pictures. Like the Chicago Sun-Times, RedEye is a tabloid-format newspaper, oriented vertically rather than horizontally and with a front page consisting only of a large picture and a banner headline.

 Publication changes 
After 15 years of daily distribution, RedEye'' shifted to a weekly format on Feb. 9, 2017. The Thursday release of the paper focuses specifically on food and entertainment. RedEye posts content daily online.

Notes and references

External links

 

Free daily newspapers
Chicago Tribune
Newspapers published in Chicago
Publications established in 2002
2002 establishments in Illinois